The 2019 NBL season was the 38th season of the National Basketball League. The competition increased to nine teams in 2019 with the Southern Huskies joining the league for the first time, marking the first time ever that an Australian team has joined a New Zealand competition.

The regular season commenced on Thursday 11 April in Palmerston North with the Manawatu Jets hosting the Super City Rangers at Arena Manawatu. The season contained 14 weeks of regular season games followed by a Final Four weekend in July. The Saints won their 11th NBL championship in 2019 behind their second 20–0 campaign in three seasons.

Team information

Summary

Regular season standings

Final Four

Awards

Player of the Week

Team of the Week

Statistics leaders
Stats as of the end of the regular season

Regular season
 Most Valuable Player: Nick Kay (Wellington Saints)
 Most Outstanding Guard: Cameron Gliddon (Canterbury Rams)
 Most Outstanding NZ Guard: Shea Ili (Wellington Saints)
 Most Outstanding Forward: Nick Kay (Wellington Saints)
 Most Outstanding NZ Forward/Centre: Robert Loe (Wellington Saints)
 Scoring Champion: Tim Quarterman (Super City Rangers)
 Rebounding Champion: Marcel Jones (Southern Huskies)
 Assist Champion: Jarrod Kenny (Hawke's Bay Hawks)
 Golden Hands: Nick Kay (Wellington Saints)
 Most Improved Player: Ethan Rusbatch (Hawke's Bay Hawks)
 Defensive Player of the Year: Isaiah Wilkins (Canterbury Rams)
 Youth Player of the Year: Tyrell Harrison (Nelson Giants)
 Coach of the Year: Mick Downer (Canterbury Rams)
 All-Star Five:
 G: Shea Ili (Wellington Saints)
 G: Cameron Gliddon (Canterbury Rams)
 F: E. J. Singler (Hawke's Bay Hawks)
 F: Nick Kay (Wellington Saints)
 C: Brandon Bowman (Hawke's Bay Hawks)

Final Four
 Grand Final MVP: Thomas Abercrombie (Wellington Saints)

Notes

References

External links
2019 draw 
2019 season preview

National Basketball League (New Zealand) seasons
NBL